The Alvar Aalto Cultural Centre (German: Alvar-Aalto-Kulturhaus) is a cultural venue in the city of Wolfsburg, Lower Saxony, Germany, designed by the renowned Finnish architect Alvar Aalto in 1958 and inaugurated in 1962. It comprises a library, educational and youth facilities, municipal offices and retail premises.

Gallery

See also
Church of the Holy Spirit (Wolfsburg)
Stephanuskirche (Wolfsburg)

References

Buildings and structures in Wolfsburg
Alvar Aalto buildings
Modernist architecture in Germany